Arthur Plunkett may refer to:

 Arthur Plunkett, 8th Earl of Fingall (1759–1836), Roman Catholic Irish peer
 Arthur Plunkett, 9th Earl of Fingall (1791–1869), Irish peer